Jönköping County or Region Jönköping held a regional council election on 9 September 2018, on the same day as the general and municipal elections.

Results
The number of seats remained at 81 with the Social Democrats winning the most at 22, a drop of seven from 2014. There were 228,295 valid ballots cast. New party Bevara akutsjukhusen ("Maintain the emergency hospitals") became the largest party in Eksjö and Värnamo.

Municipal results

Images

References

Elections in Jönköping County
Jönköping